Kozhukhovo is a rural locality (a village) in Turovetskoye Rural Settlement, Mezhdurechensky District, Vologda Oblast, Russia. The population was 68 as of 2002. There are 3 streets.

Geography 
Kozhukhovo is located 266 km northeast of Shuyskoye (the district's administrative centre) by road. Selishcha is the nearest rural locality.

References 

Rural localities in Mezhdurechensky District, Vologda Oblast